Lee Stephen Burge (born 9 January 1993) is an English professional footballer who plays as a goalkeeper for League Two club Northampton Town.

Club career

Coventry City
On 30 January 2013 Burge joined Conference National side Nuneaton Town on loan for a month, with a view of gaining more experience, He made his Nuneaton Town debut on 2 February 2013 in a 3–2 loss to Stockport County. Burge was joined at Nuneaton by fellow Sky Blue Aaron Phillips, both Burge and Phillips had their loan spells extended until the end of the season and were influential in saving Nuneaton from relegation.

At the beginning of the 2014–15 season following Joe Murphy's transfer, Burge was handed the number one shirt. Burge made his professional debut starting on 13 August 2014 in a 2-1 League Cup loss to Cardiff City.

After some poor displays from first-choice keeper Ryan Allsop in the opening few months of the 2014–15 season, Burge was handed his first league start for Coventry City against Peterborough United on 25 October 2014 resulting in a 3–2 win after trailing 2–0 at half-time. The following home game was The FA Cup round one, Burge was sent-off after 39 minutes for kicking a Worcester City player, conceding a penalty that was scored. Reduced to 10 men, the Sky Blues lost the game 2-1 and suffered their first ever FA Cup first round exit and their first loss to a non-league side since 1989.

On 30 September 2018, Burge was struck by a puck while watching local ice hockey team Coventry Blaze play against the Sheffield Steelers at the SkyDome Arena.

On 30th June 2019 Burge was Released by Coventry on the expiry of his contract.

Sunderland
On 3 July 2019, he joined Sunderland on a two-year deal. Following an impressive 2020–21 season, Burge was named in the 2020–21 EFL League One Team of the Season at the league's annual awards ceremony. Sunderland announced on May 25, 2022 that he will be released when his contract runs out on June 30, 2022

Northampton Town
On 22 June 2022, it was announced that Burge would be joining Northampton Town on the 1st of July 2022

Career statistics

Honours
Coventry City
EFL Trophy: 2016–17
EFL League Two play-offs: 2018

Sunderland
EFL Trophy: 2020–21
 EFL League One play-offs: 2022

Individual
EFL League One Team of the Season: 2020–21

References

External links
Lee Burge player profile at ccfc.co.uk

1993 births
Living people
Footballers from Coventry
English footballers
Association football goalkeepers
Coventry City F.C. players
Nuneaton Borough F.C. players
Sunderland A.F.C. players
National League (English football) players
English Football League players